Wesley Cash is an American former professional tennis player.

Cash, a native of Chattanooga, was undefeated in his four years at Baylor School and played collegiate tennis for the University of Georgia. He was a three-time All-SEC during his time at Georgia and played in three SEC championship teams. On the professional tour he won a Challenger tournament in 1983, partnering John Mattke in the doubles.

ATP Challenger titles

Doubles: (1)

References

External links
 

Year of birth missing (living people)
Living people
American male tennis players
Georgia Bulldogs tennis players
Baylor School alumni
Tennis people from Tennessee
Sportspeople from Chattanooga, Tennessee